Cornus canadensis is a species of flowering plant in the dogwood family Cornaceae, native to eastern Asia and North America. Common names include Canadian dwarf cornel, Canadian bunchberry, quatre-temps, crackerberry, and creeping dogwood.

Description
The vertically produced above-ground stems are slender and unbranched. Produced near the terminal node, the leaves are shiny dark green and arranged oppositely on the stem, clustered with six leaves that often seem to be in a whorl because the internodes are compressed. The leaves consist of two types: two larger and four smaller leaves; the smaller ones develop from the axillary buds of the larger leaves. The leaves have petioles  in length and leaf blades that are obovate. In autumn, the leaves have red-tinted veins and turn completely red.

Flowers

The inflorescences are made up of compound terminal cymes, with large showy white bracts that resemble petals. The bracts are green when immature. The lower nodes on the stem have greatly reduced rudimentary leaves. The calyx tube is obovate in shape and 1 mm long, covered with densely pubescent hairs along with grayish white appressed trichomes. Stamens are very short, being 1 mm long. The anthers are yellowish white in color, narrowly ovoid in shape. The styles are 1 mm long and glabrous. Plants are for the most part self-sterile and dependent on pollinators for sexual reproduction. Pollinators include bumblebees, solitary bees, beeflies, and syrphid flies. The fruits look like berries but are drupes.

Pollen release 
Each flower has highly elastic petals that flip backward, releasing springy filaments that are cocked underneath the petals. The filaments snap upward flinging pollen out of containers hinged to the filaments. The stamens accelerate at a rate of 24,000 m/s. The motion, which can be triggered by pollinators, takes place in less than half a millisecond. The bunchberry has one of the fastest plant actions found so far requiring a camera capable of shooting 10,000 frames per second to catch the action.

Fruit

The drupes are green, globose in shape, turning bright red at maturity in late summer; each fruit is 5 mm in diameter and contains typically one or two ellipsoid-ovoid shaped stones. The fruits come into season in late summer. The large seeds within are somewhat hard and crunchy.

Taxonomy
While distinctive as a species itself, the generic placement of these plants has differed in various botanical treatments. When the genus Cornus is taken broadly, as done here, this species is Cornus canadensis, and is included in the subgenus Arctocrania. However, if Cornus is treated in a narrower sense, excluding this species, it can instead be classified as Chamaepericlymenum canadense or as Cornella canadensis.

Where C. canadensis, a forest species, and Cornus suecica, a bog species, grow near each other in their overlapping ranges in Alaska, Labrador, and Greenland, they can hybridize by cross-pollination, producing plants with intermediate characteristics.

Distribution and habitat
Its native distribution includes Japan, North Korea, northeastern China (Jilin Province), the Russian Far East, the northern United States, Colorado, New Mexico, Canada and Greenland. 

Cornus canadensis is a mesophytic species that needs cool, moist soils. It inhabits montane and boreal coniferous forests, where it is found growing along the margins of moist woods, on old tree stumps, in mossy areas, and among other open and moist habitats.

Ecology
Birds are the main dispersal agents of the seeds, feeding on the fruit during their fall migration. In Alaska, bunchberry is an important forage plant for mule deer, black-tailed deer and moose, which eat it throughout the growing season.

Uses
It is used as ornamental groundcover in gardens. It prefers moist acidic soil.

The fruits are edible raw but have little flavor. The pulp does not easily separate from the seeds. The berries can be cooked, strained, and combined with other fruits or used for pudding.

Culture
Claire Waight Keller included the plant to represent Canada in Meghan Markle's wedding veil, which included the distinctive flora of each Commonwealth country.

References

External links

Exploding Dogwood Flowers Williams College website describing the work of Joan Edwards and Dwight Whittaker, with videos and animations.
Cornus canadensis holotype from Louis-Marie Herbarium (Laval University).
Bunchberry, borealforest.org
Bunchberry, Ontario's Wildflowers

canadensis
Edible fruits
Flora of North America
Flora of Japan
Flora of Russia
Flora of Jilin
Flora of Korea
Plants described in 1753
Taxa named by Carl Linnaeus